Gello is a village in Tuscany, central Italy, administratively a frazione of the comune of San Giuliano Terme, province of Pisa. At the time of the 2001 census its population was 1,830.

Gello is about 4 km from Pisa and 2 km from San Giuliano Terme.

Notable people
 

Giovanni Chiocca (1911–1960), writer and editor

References 

Frazioni of the Province of Pisa